Gardnersville or Gardnesville is a township in the Greater Monrovia District, Liberia.

During the Liberian Civil War, the area was war torn and thousands of refugees hid in buildings in Gardnersville and Chocolate City.  On 20 October 1992, two American nuns from the Precious Blood order were ambushed by soldiers of the National Patriotic Front of Liberia and murdered and had their vehicle stolen. In 1993 the situation became so bad that the suburb became inaccessible.

In 2018 President George Weah appointed Rev. David Roberts as Commissioner for Gardnersville.

References

City corporations, townships and borough of the Greater Monrovia District
History of Liberia